Mosese Tuipulotu (born 5 May 2001) is an Australian rugby union player, currently playing for the . His preferred position is centre.

Early career
Tuipulotu was born in Melbourne, Australia and is the brother of Scotland international Sione Tuipulotu. Like his brother, he is also Scottish-qualified.

Professional career
Tuipulotu played his junior rugby in Victoria, playing in the Dewar Shield. He moved to New South Wales in 2021, representing the Eastern Suburbs team. He was first named in the Waratahs squad for the 2022 season, although did not feature due to injury. In the same week, he was heavily linked to a move to Scotland.

References

External links
itsrugby.co.uk Profile

2001 births
Living people
Australian rugby union players
Rugby union centres
New South Wales Waratahs players
Rugby union players from Melbourne